James "Buster" Ross Brown (August 4, 1909 – July 7, 2000) was a Canadian athlete who competed in the 1932 Summer Olympics.

In 1932 he was a member of the Canadian relay team which finished fourth in the Olympic 4×100 metres event.

At the 1930 Empire Games he won the gold medal with the Canadian relay team in the 4×110 yards competition. In the 100 yards contest he was eliminated in the heats. He died in Edmonton in 2000 from complication arising from a broken hip, aged 90.

Competition record

References

External links
Jim Brown's profile at Sports Reference.com

1909 births
2000 deaths
Athletes from Edmonton
Canadian male sprinters
Olympic track and field athletes of Canada
Athletes (track and field) at the 1932 Summer Olympics
Athletes (track and field) at the 1930 British Empire Games
Commonwealth Games gold medallists for Canada
Commonwealth Games medallists in athletics
Medallists at the 1930 British Empire Games